Malta competed in the Eurovision Song Contest 2000 in Stockholm, Sweden. The Maltese entry was selected through the Malta Song for Europe contest, where the winner was Claudette Pace with the song "Desire".

Before Eurovision

Malta Song for Europe 2000 
The final was held on 15 January 2000 at the Mediterranean Conference Centre in Valletta, hosted by Stephanie Farrugia, Miriam Dalli and Charles Saliba. The winner was chosen by an "expert" jury. A televote was also held which Claudette Pace won, with Fabrizio Faniello placing second and Alwyn Borg Myatt placing in third.

At Eurovision
On the night of the final, Malta performed 7th, following Romania and preceding Norway. At the end of the voting, Malta had received 73 points, placing 8th in a field of 24.

Voting

References

External links
Maltese National Final 2000

2000
Countries in the Eurovision Song Contest 2000
Eurovision